Sandra Beech (born Sandra Millar  1942 in Ballymena, Northern Ireland) is an Irish-Canadian children's musician. She was a member of the family music group The Musical Millars after relocating to Canada in 1953. After her 1964 marriage to Len Beech, she specialised in recording children's music.

Her brothers Will and George Millar, plus her cousin Joe Millar, were members of The Irish Rovers.

Sandra Beech has three daughters with her husband Len Beech: Carrie Beech, Heather Beech and Jennifer Beech.
Sandra Beech also has nine granddaughters.

Awards and recognition
 1980: Nominee, Juno Award for Best Children's Album, Chickery Chick
 1982: WINNER, Juno Award for Best Children's Album, Inch By Inch
 1991: Nominee, Juno Award for Best Children's Album, Yes I Can
 1999: Nominee, Juno Award for Best Children's Album, Celebrate the Music

Discography

 1979: Chickery Chick
 1982: Inch By Inch (Attic)
 1982: Sunshine Songs (Attic)
 1984: Songs About Animals and Others (Golden)
 1984: Sidewalk Shuffle (Kids Records)
 1989: Yes I Can (A&M)
 1994: The Celtic Collection (Western Publishing/Golden)
 1995: Sandra Beech sings safety songs (OBPPI) 
 1998: Celebrate the Music (Page Music) 
 2003: The Pretend Box Songs (compilation, Page Music/EMI)

References

External links
Sandra Beech official site

 

Living people
1940s births
Canadian children's musicians
Juno Award for Children's Album of the Year winners
Expatriates from Northern Ireland in Canada
People from Ballymena